Julius Karanu Gicheru is an Anglican bishop in Kenya: since 2014 he has been the inaugural Bishop of Murang'a South. He is the first Bishop of the said Diocese which was curved from the Diocese of Mt Kenya Central.

References

21st-century Anglican bishops of the Anglican Church of Kenya
Anglican bishops of Murang'a South
Year of birth missing (living people)
Living people